Roman Yuriovych Chumak (born 1 October 1982) is a Ukrainian football goalkeeper currently playing for Ukrainian Second League club Shakhtar Sverdlovsk.

He is a son of Yuriy Chumak.

Club history
Roman Chumak began his football career in UFC Dnipropetrovsk in Dnipropetrovsk. He transferred to FC Kremin Kremenchuk during 2008 summer transfer window. In February 2010, Chumak left Kremin and moved to First League team Oleksandria.

Career statistics

References

External links

 Profile – Official Oleksandria site 
 PFC Oleksandria Squad on the PFL website 
 

1982 births
Living people
Footballers from Dnipro
FC Kremin Kremenchuk players
FC Vorskla Poltava players
FC Oleksandriya players
FC Shakhtar Sverdlovsk players
Ukrainian footballers
Association football goalkeepers